Mingevannet is a lake in Østfold county, Norway. It forms a part of the Glomma watershed together with Ågårdselva and Visterflo.

See also
List of lakes in Norway

Sarpsborg
Lakes of Viken (county)